Ballysillan Swifts Football Club is an amateur football club from Belfast in Northern Ireland.

The First Team plays in Division 2A of the Northern Amateur Football League, and the Reserves in Division 3D. The Under 23 (3rd) team plays in the Ballymena & Provincial Football League. Home venue for the all the teams is Ballysillan Playing Fields.

The junior teams compete in the South Belfast Youth League.

References

External links
 ballysillanswiftsfc.niclubs.co.uk 
 thenafl.co.uk/ (For all Amateur League related news, results, tables, etc.)
 nifootball.co.uk - (For fixtures, results and tables of all Northern Ireland amateur football leagues)

Association football clubs in Northern Ireland
Association football clubs in Belfast